Courtney Alexandra Sweetman-Kirk (born 16 November 1990) is an English footballer who plays as a forward for Sheffield United in the FA Women's Championship. She has previously played for FA WSL clubs Liverpool, Everton, Notts County and Lincoln as well as Coventry City and Leicester City in the FA Women's Premier League. Sweetman-Kirk has represented England at under-23 level.

Club career

Lincoln / Notts County, 2013–2014 
Sweetman-Kirk signed with FA WSL 1 club, Lincoln Ladies in July 2013.

Doncaster Rovers Belles, 2015–2017 
In July 2014, Sweetman-Kirk signed with FA WSL 2 club, Doncaster Rovers Belles. She scored 20 goals in 20 matches during the 2015 FA WSL 2 season, helping lift the team to FA WSL 1 the following year. She was subsequently named FA WSL 2 Players' Player of the Year. During a match against Everton in August 2015, Sweetman-Kirk scored a hat trick after subbing in during the second half of the match when Everton was up 2–0. Her hat trick resulted in a 3–2 win.

In 2016, she signed a full-time professional contract with Doncaster, only to suffer a broken leg in a pre-season friendly. Although Doncaster were relegated in her absence, in the subsequent FA WSL Spring Series resurgent Sweetman-Kirk scored nine goals in nine games to finish as WSL 2 top goalscorer.

Everton, 2017–2018 
Everton signed Sweetman-Kirk from Doncaster after their promotion to the WSL 1, on a two-year contract and paying an undisclosed fee. She was Everton's top-goalscorer in her first season with nine goals in all competitions

Liverpool, 2018–2020
Sweetman-Kirk transferred to local rivals Liverpool in July 2018. On 23 May 2020, while the league was still suspended indefinitely during the COVID-19 pandemic, Sweetman-Kirk announced she had left the club following the expiration of her contract earlier in the month.

International 
Sweetman-Kirk made her debut for the England under-23 national team in June 2013. Her five goals during the tournament (including a hat trick against Ireland) helped Great Britain win the 2013 World University Games in Russia.

Career statistics

Club
.

Honours

Club
Coventry City
 Birmingham FA County Cup: 2013

Individual
 FA WSL 2 Players' Player of the Year: 2015
 FA WSL 2 Spring Series Top Goalscorer: 2015

Sky
Sweetman-Kirk has been an occasional match reporter for Soccer Saturday on Sky Sports.

References

External links
 

1990 births
Living people
English women's footballers
Women's association football forwards
Women's Super League players
Doncaster Rovers Belles L.F.C. players
Liverpool F.C. Women players
Footballers from Leicester
Alumni of Nottingham Trent University
England women's under-23 international footballers
FA Women's National League players
Coventry United W.F.C. players
Everton F.C. (women) players
Notts County L.F.C. players
Women's Championship (England) players
Leicester City W.F.C. players
Universiade gold medalists for Great Britain
Universiade medalists in football
Medalists at the 2013 Summer Universiade
Sheffield United W.F.C. players